The following is a list of cities and towns in Botswana with population of over 3,000 citizens. State capitals are shown in boldface.

References

Botswana, List of cities in
 
Botswana
Cities